Vasily Buzunov (4 February 1928 in Ishim, Kemerovo Oblast – 18 February 2004) was a Russian footballer and hockey player.

In 1946 he began his career in football and hockey for Spartak Krasnoyarsk, where the following year moved to Dinamo Krasnoyarsk. When the time came to serve in the army was sent to a military club in Irkutsk. After two years, moved first to Sverdlovsk, and in 1952 to Moscow, where he played for CDSA Moscow and Moscow MWO. In 1953 he moved to Dinamo Moscow. He later played for ODO Sverdlovsk and from 1959 to 1960 he served in the GDR team playing in a Representative district. In 1962 ended his football career at Volga Kalinin. Buzunov was a bronze medalist at the USSR Championships in 1958, a champion of the First Division of the USSR: 1955, 1961 and USSR Championship top scorer in 1956 (17 goals) and 1957 (16 goals).

References

1928 births
2004 deaths
People from Yaysky District
FC Dynamo Moscow players
PFC CSKA Moscow players
Russian footballers
Soviet football managers
Soviet footballers
Soviet Top League players
Association footballers not categorized by position
Sportspeople from Kemerovo Oblast